Dīvāneh (also spelled Ḏiwāna, Divana, Dīwānah, or Diwana) is a village in Kunduz Province, Afghanistan.

See also
 Kunduz Province

References

Populated places in Kunduz Province